An election to Kerry County Council took place on 7 June 1979 as part of that year's Irish local elections. 26 councillors were elected from four electoral divisions by PR-STV voting.

Results by party

Results by Electoral Area

Killarney

Killorglin

Listowel

Tralee

External links
http://opac.oireachtas.ie/AWData/Library3/Library2/DL015721.pdf
https://irishelectionliterature.com/others-project/old-local-election-results/

1979 Irish local elections
1979